Park Yong-ha (Korean: 박용하, August 12, 1977 – June 30, 2010) was a South Korean actor and singer.

Career
At seventeen, Park was noted for his acting and musical skills, as well as his good looks which earned him popularity with fans. After his debut in MBC drama Theme Theater (1994), Park appeared in a range of TV dramas and films. In 2002, Park co-starred in Winter Sonata with Bae Yong-joon and Choi Ji-woo, which brought him fame in Japan.

Music
As a singer, Park was the "mysterious" voice behind Just For Yesterday, the hit theme song of SBS drama All In, which starred Lee Byung-hun and Song Hye-kyo.

Park released various Japanese albums in Japan and held successful concerts both in Japan and Korea.

Park sang the theme songs of SBS drama On Air in 2008. The Japanese version of the theme songs was his 6th single album Behind Love. Behind Love, released on July 23, 2008, was ranked as the third top single album on Oricon, Japan's premier daily album chart. His next single album, Say Goodbye, and full-length album, Love, were released in November 2008 and both were ranked on Oricon within top 10.

Film and television

Park starred in SBS drama On Air as a drama PD, Kyoung-min Lee, in 2008 and on Mnet Japan from July 30, 2008. He and co-star Song Yun-ah visited Japan to promote the series in a showcase attend by 800 VIP guests at Toho Cinema in Roppongi Hills, Tokyo. He also starred in the movie The Scam as an individual investor (small-time investor) Hyun-soo Kang. The Scam was released on February 12, 2009. He was cast in the drama, The Slingshot, acting as the character Kim Shin, which started broadcasting on KBS2 on April 6, 2009.

Death
Park was found dead by his mother at 5:30 am June 30, 2010 at his home in Nonhyeon-dong, Seoul, hanging from a camcorder charger cable after committing suicide. Prior to his suicide, he was apparently suffering from the pressures of managing his entertainment company and his career, whilst also coping with his father having cancer. He did not leave a suicide note.

Released in 2011, In Heaven included a song dedicated to Park by his good friend Kim Jaejoong.

Discography

Korean albums
 Tidings (2003)
 The Memory (2010)

Japan releases

Albums 
 kibyol (2004)
 Fiction (2004)
 Will Be There  (2006)
 Present (2007)
 Love (2008)
 Stars (2010)
 Song For You (2014) (Posthumous Release)

Mini-albums 
 Sometime (2005)
 Once in a Summer (2009)

Singles 
 2003 처음 그날처럼 (Like the First Day)
 Kajimaseyo (2004)
 Truth (2005)
 Kimigasaikou (2006)
 Bokunopagewomekureba (2007)
 Forever (2007)
 Behind love (2008)
 Say Goodbye (2008)
 Beloved People (2009)
 One Love (2010)

Filmography

Film 
 The Scam (2009)
 Although It is Hateful Again 2002 (2002)
 If It Snows on Christmas (1998)

TV drama 
 The Slingshot (2009)
 On Air (2008)
 Tokyo Wankei (2004)
 Loving You (2002)
 KBS Winter Sonata (2002)
 Sunflower (2000)
 소문난 여자 Somun (2001)
 KBS Snowflakes (2001)
 More Than Love
 See and See Again (보고 또 보고 / Bo go Tto Bo go) (1998)
 What A Tough Woman (1997)

Awards
2010: 2010 SKY Perfect TV Awards, Japan, "Grand Prix", "Korean Wave (Han-Ryu)"
2009: 2009 KOFICE (Korea Foundation for International Culture Exchange) Awards
2008: 2008 SBS Drama Awards, "Best Actor for Drama Special Section", "Top 10 Stars"
2008: 2008 SKY Perfect TV Awards, Japan, "Grand Prix", "Korean Wave (Han-Ryu)"
2008: 2008 Mnet 20's Choice Awards, "Hot Global Star"
2008: 22nd Japan Gold Disc Awards, "Best Asian Artist"
2007: 21st Japan Gold Disc Awards, "Best Asian Artist"
2006: 20th Japan Gold Disc Awards, "Song of the Year", "Japan-Korea Friendship Year 2005 Special Award"
2005: 19th Japan Gold Disc Awards, "Best New Artist"
2004: 10th Seoul Music Awards, "Han-Ryu Artist"
2002: KBS Drama Awards, "Excellence Award, Actor" 
1998: MBC Drama Awards, "Best New Actor"

References

External links 
 Park Yong-ha on HanCinema

1977 births
2010 deaths
Male actors from Seoul
Singers from Seoul
K-pop singers
South Korean male singers
South Korean pop singers
South Korean male film actors
South Korean male television actors
21st-century South Korean male actors
Suicides by hanging in South Korea
Chung-Ang University alumni
South Korean Buddhists
2010 suicides